Sir Geoffrey Gould Briggs (6 May 1914 – 12 May 1993) was an English lawyer and judge. He was Chief Justice of the Supreme Court of Hong Kong in the 1970s and of Brunei in the 1980s.

Early life

Briggs was born in 1914, the second son of Reverend C. E. Briggs of Amersham, Buckinghamshire. He was educated at Sherborne School and Christ Church, Oxford where he took the degrees of Bachelor of Arts and Bachelor of Civil Law. He was called to the bar of Gray's Inn in 1938. He served during World War II as a Major in the County of London Yeomanry.

Legal career

In 1954, Briggs was appointed Attorney General of Eastern Nigeria.  He was appointed a Queen's Counsel for Nigeria in 1955.

In 1958, he was appointed Puisne Judge of the Unified Judiciary of Sarawak, North Borneo and Brunei. He served there until 1962 when he was appointed Chief Judicial Commissioner for the Western Pacific.

In 1965, he was appointed Puisne Judge in Hong Kong and later promoted to Chief Justice of Hong Kong in 1973 upon the retirement of Ivo Rigby.  In that position, he served concurrently as Chief Justice of Brunei. He served as Chief Justice of Brunei and Hong Kong until 1979.

He was knighted in the 1974 New Year Honours.

Retirement

Briggs retired to England in 1979.  He continued to serve in a number of judicial roles in retirement, including President of the Brunei Court of Appeals (1979–1988), Justice of Appeal, Court of Appeal, Gibraltar (1983 to 1988) and President of the Pensions Appeal Tribunal for England and Wales (1980 to 1987). He died in Bath in 1993.

References

1914 births
1993 deaths
Alumni of Christ Church, Oxford
British Army personnel of World War II
Chief Justices of the Supreme Court of Hong Kong
British Hong Kong judges
Knights Bachelor
Members of Gray's Inn
Lawyers awarded knighthoods
People educated at Sherborne School
20th-century British lawyers
Chief judicial commissioners for the Western Pacific
British Borneo judges
People from colonial Nigeria
Sarawak, North Borneo and Brunei judges